The men's 3000 metres steeplechase at the 1969 European Athletics Championships was held in Athens, Greece, at Georgios Karaiskakis Stadium on 18 and 20 September 1969.

Medalists

Results

Final
20 September

Heats
18 September

Heat 1

Heat 2

Participation
According to an unofficial count, 19 athletes from 11 countries participated in the event.

 (1)
 (2)
 (2)
 (1)
 (1)
 (3)
 (1)
 (3)
 (1)
 (2)
 (2)

References

3000 metres steeplechase
Steeplechase at the European Athletics Championships